Levente Horváth (born 13 April 1982 in Budapest) is a Hungarian football player who currently plays for Rákospalotai EAC.

References
HLSZ
EUFO

1982 births
Living people
Footballers from Budapest
Hungarian footballers
Association football midfielders
Újpest FC players
MTK Budapest FC players
BKV Előre SC footballers
BFC Siófok players
Paksi FC players
Nyíregyháza Spartacus FC players
Lombard-Pápa TFC footballers
Vasas SC players
Nemzeti Bajnokság I players
Nemzeti Bajnokság II players